Levi, Ray & Shoup, Inc. (LRS) is a privately held multinational corporation headquartered in Springfield, Illinois USA that develops and sells computer software, along with providing a range of information technology services, through its various product divisions.

Domestic LRS offices are located in Bloomington, Illinois; Glastonbury, Connecticut; St. Louis, Missouri; Atlanta, Georgia; Cedar Rapids, Iowa; Overland Park, Kansas; Richardson, Texas; Franklin, Tennessee; and Anaheim, California. International LRS offices are located in Paris, France; Hallbergmoos, Germany; Milano, Italy; Madrid, Spain; Cheltenham, UK; North Sydney, Australia; Stockholm, Sweden; and Singapore.

History
LRS was founded on September 21, 1979. Dick Levi was joined by Roger Ray and Bob Shoup shortly after the firm opened in the fall of 1979. Levi eventually bought out his partners, Shoup in 1980 and Ray in 1993.

Levi developed the company’s first product in 1981, VTAM Printer Support (VPS), which enabled mainframe computers to send print jobs from the JES Spool to devices outside the data center.

When the company first built out its current headquarters in 1988, they had 37 employees. When a 100,000 square foot addition was built in 1998, the company was up to 400 employees — including 275 in Springfield — spread across the Springfield office and nine branch offices. 

By 2019, when the company built a new 58,000-square-foot building, it had 850 employees across 24 offices. About 361 employees were working at company headquarters, making LRS one of Springfield’s largest private employers. 

LRS has also grown by acquisition. LRS acquired Pennington & Schurter Information Services, Inc. of Morton, Illinois, and Springfield-based Integrated Business Systems, Inc. (IBSI) in 1995; MacKenzie & Roth, Inc. of St. Louis in 1999;  Capella Technologies, based in Anaheim, CA, in 2013; Stockholm, Sweden-based software company Cirrato Technologies AB in 2016; and U.S.-based Drivve Inc. in 2018.

Tim Wilkerson Sponsorship
LRS became a sponsor of NHRA drag racer Tim Wilkerson’s funny car in 2000, when Wilkerson was entering 15 or 16 of the NHRA’s 23 races each year. Near the end of the 2002 season, LRS announced that it would increase its support and enable Wilkerson to compete in the tour’s full schedule.
Since then, Wilkerson has won the US Nationals in Indianapolis in 2003, again in 2021 and finished second overall in 2008.

PGA Sponsorship
LRS has been the presenting sponsor of the PGA Lincoln Land Championship, held at Panther Creek Country Club since 2019. The Lincoln Land Championship is an event on the PGA's Korn Ferry Tour.

References

External links
 

Software companies based in Illinois
Companies based in Sangamon County, Illinois
Software companies of the United States